Rizvan Geliskhanov (born 1963) is a retired Soviet weightlifter of Chechen origin. He won a silver medal at the 1989 World Championships, in the class over 110 kg, and a bronze at the 1990 European Championships, until 110 kg. Domestically he held the Soviet title in 1987; in 1988 he won the snatch and clean and jerk events, but placed second in the total, in the 110 kg categorie.

References

1963 births
Living people
Soviet male weightlifters
World Weightlifting Championships medalists
Place of birth missing (living people)
Date of birth missing (living people)
European Weightlifting Championships medalists